took place at the Nippon Budokan in Chiyoda, Tokyo, December 31, 1991, starting at 7:00PM JST. The primary ceremonies were broadcast in Japan by TBS/JNN/JRN.

Award winners

Pops and Rock

Japan Record Award
KAN for "Ai wa Katsu"

Best Vocalist Award
Aska for "Hajimari wa itsumo ame"

Best New Artist Award
Mi-Ke for "Omoide no Kujūkuri-hama"

Best Album Award
Tatsuro Yamashita for "Artisan"

Gold disc Award (Nomination for the Japan Record Award)
Tatsuro Yamashita for "Artisan"
Kyōko Koizumi for "Anata ni aete yokatta"
Chage and Aska for "Say Yes"
Aska for "Hajimari wa itsumo ame"
Kazumasa Oda for "Love Story wa Totsuzen ni"

New Artist Award (Nomination for the Best New Artist Award)
Michiyo Nakajima for "Akai Hanataba"
Noriyuki Makihara for "Donna toki mo"
Mi-Ke for "Omoide no Kujūkuri-hama"
Alisa Mizuki for "Densetsu no Shōjo"

Album Award
Tatsuro Yamashita for "Artisan"
Buck-Tick for "Kurutta Taiyou"
Aska for "Scene II"
X for "Jealousy"
Yumi Matsutoya for "Tengoku no door"
Eikichi Yazawa for "Don't Wanna Stop"
Princess Princess for "Princess Princess"
Yuko Hara for "Mother"
B'z for "Risky"
Dreams Come True for "Wonder 3"

Best Album / New Artist Award
ORIGINAL LOVE for "LOVE!LOVE! & LOVE!"

Special Award
Orquesta de la Luz

Composition Award
ASKA for "SAY YES","Hajimari wa itsumo ame" （vo.:ASKA）

Arrangement Award
Takeshi Kobayashi for "Anata ni aete yokatta" （vo.:Kyōko Koizumi）

Lyrics Award
Kyōko Koizumi for "Anata ni aete yokatta" （vo.:Kyōko Koizumi）

Planning Award
HIS(Haruomi Hosono, Kiyoshiro Imawano, Fuyumi Sakamoto) for "Nihon no hito"
KRYZLER & KOMPANY
The Nolans sang Japanese Idol & Pops
Fumiaki Miyamoto for "Ao no kaori"

Best Foreign Artist
Mariah Carey

Enka and Kayōkyoku

Japan Record Award
Saburo Kitajima for "Kita no daichi"

Best Vocalist
Fuyumi Sakamoto for "Hinokuni no onna"

Best New Artist
Jun Karaki for "Yasegaman"

Best Album Award
Takao Horiuchi for "GENTS"

Gold disc Award (Nomination for the Japan Record Award)
Kaori Kozai for "Haguresō"
Saburo Kitajima for "Kita no daichi"
Kye Eun-Sook for "Kanashimi no hōmonsya"

New Artist Award (Nomination for the Best New Artist Award)
Jun Karaki for "Yasegaman"
Shijimi to Sazae for "Monomane Omoide no Kujūkuri-hama"

Album Award
Mitsuko Nakanura for "Shiawase zake"
Takao Horiuchi for "GENTS"
Hitoshi Ueki for "Sūdara-Densetsu"

Composition Award
Syōsuke Ichikawa for "Koi banka" （vo.:Natsuko Godai）

Arrangement Award
Eiji Kawamura for "Kanashimi no hōmonsya" （vo.:Kye Eun-Sook）

Lyrics Award
Takashi Taka for "Hinokuni no onna" （vo.:Fuyumi Sakamoto）

Planning Award
Miyako Otsuki for "Hashi-monogatari Jissyō"
Jirō Sugita for "Love Letter" (composed by Tadashi Yoshida)

Achievement Award
Peggy Hayama (Introducing foreign songs)

Lifetime Achievement Award
Hachiro Kasuga

Special Award
Linda Yamamoto
International Friendship Foundation and producer Hiroshi Itsuki

Hibari Misora Award
Ayako Fuji for "Amayo zake"

See also
Japan Composer's Association
Enka
Kayōkyoku
Hibari Misora

References

External links
Japan Composer's Association 33rd Japan Record Awards

Japan Record Awards
Japan Record Awards
Japan Record Awards
Japan Record Awards
1991